NASA Astronaut Group 3—'The Fourteen'—was a group of fourteen astronauts selected by NASA for the Gemini and Apollo program. Their selection was announced in October 1963. Seven were from the United States Air Force, four from the United States Navy, one was from the United States Marine Corps and two were civilians. Four died in training accidents before they could fly in space. All of the surviving ten flew Apollo missions; five also flew Gemini missions. Buzz Aldrin, Alan Bean, Gene Cernan and David Scott walked on the Moon.

Group 3 was the first to waive the requirement of a test pilot background, though military jet fighter aircraft experience was substituted. This applied to Buzz Aldrin, Bill Anders, Gene Cernan, Roger Chaffee, Walter Cunningham and Rusty Schweickart; all the others were test pilots. On average, its members were younger, slightly taller and heavier than the previous two groups, and better educated.

Background 
The launch of the Sputnik 1 satellite by the Soviet Union on October 4, 1957, started a Cold War technological and ideological competition with the United States known as the Space Race. The demonstration of American technological inferiority came as a profound shock to the American public. In response to the Sputnik crisis, the U.S. President Dwight D. Eisenhower created a new civilian agency, the National Aeronautics and Space Administration (NASA), to oversee an American space program. The Space Task Group (STG) at the NASA Langley Research Center in Hampton, Virginia, created an American spaceflight project called Project Mercury, which aimed to send a person to space and then into orbit. The selection of the first astronauts, known as the "Original Seven" or "Mercury Seven", was announced on April 9, 1959.

By 1961, although it was yet to launch a person into space, the STG was confident that Project Mercury had overcome its initial setbacks, and the United States had overtaken the Soviet Union as the most advanced nation in space technology. The STG began considering Mercury Mark II, a two-person successor to the original Mercury spacecraft. This confidence was shattered on April 12, 1961, when the Soviet Union launched Vostok 1, and cosmonaut Yuri Gagarin became the first person to orbit the Earth. In response, President John F. Kennedy announced a far more ambitious goal on May 25, 1961: to put a man on the Moon by the end of the decade. This already had a name: Project Apollo. The two-person Mercury II spacecraft concept was officially named Project Gemini on January 3, 1962. On April 18, 1962, NASA formally announced that it was accepting applications for a second group of astronauts who would assist the Mercury astronauts with Project Mercury, and join them in flying Project Gemini missions. It was anticipated that they might go on to command Project Apollo missions. Nine candidates, known as the "Next Nine", were selected, and their names were publicly announced on September 17, 1962.

By May 1963, while there were enough astronauts for the needs of Project Gemini, the schedule for Project Apollo called for four crewed Earth-orbit missions launched by Saturn I rockets in 1965; between two and four launched by Saturn IB rockets in 1966; and six or more Earth-orbit and lunar-orbit missions launched by Saturn V rockets, commencing in 1967. On that schedule, the NASA Chief of the Astronaut Office, grounded Mercury Seven astronaut Deke Slayton, could foresee a shortage of astronauts, although he doubted so many flights would actually be flown. Moreover, by mid-1963, three Mercury Seven astronauts—Scott Carpenter, John Glenn and himself—were no longer flying, leaving thirteen active astronauts. On that basis, he calculated an attrition rate of about ten percent per year. It followed that Project Apollo might require another ten to twenty astronauts. On June 5, 1963, NASA announced that it would be recruiting ten to fifteen new astronauts. Civilian applications had to be submitted by July 1, 1963; military ones were due by July 15, to give the services time to pre-screen their applicants.

Selection criteria 
The selection criteria were similar to those for the Next Nine, except that the minimum flight hours was lowered to 1,000, with test pilot qualification no longer required, and the maximum age was lowered to 34. The key criteria were that candidates were:
 U.S. citizens;
 aged less than 34 on June 30, 1963;
  or less in height; 
 with a degree in engineering or the physical sciences;
 were experienced test pilots, or with 1,000 hours jet pilot flying time; and
 recommended by employer.

Selection process 
A selection panel was established, consisting of Mercury Seven astronauts Deke Slayton, Alan Shepard, Wally Schirra and John Glenn, and NASA test pilot Warren J. North, the chief of the Flight Crew Operations. By the deadlines, 720 applications were received, of which 492 were from military personnel and 228 were from civilians. Of these, 490 were considered eligible, and 136 were selected for screening. The selection panel considered the applications between July 17 and 20, and picked the top 34 for further examination.

They were sent to Brooks Air Force Base for medical examinations between July 31 and August 15. Candidates were relieved that "we were not subjected to the indignities endured by the original seven." Tests included cardiograms, running on treadmills, electrocephalograms, and blood sugar tests. Hypoxia tests were carried out to see how they reacted to a loss of oxygen, they were spun about in darkened rooms to test their resistance to motion sickness, and ice water was poured into one ear to test how the inner ears reacted to such an imbalance. Psychological tests included being given a blank sheet of white paper and asked what it depicted. Michael Collins, one of the few who had been through the process in 1962, said it was of polar bears having sex in the snow. Six candidates were eliminated on medical grounds.

The final stage of the selection process were interviews by the selection panel, which were conducted at the Manned Spacecraft Center (MSC) in Houston between September 2 and 7. Collins felt that the interview was easier the second time around. The panellists were no longer strangers, the questions they asked were no longer unpredictable, and he had the benefit of having attended the United States Air Force (USAF) Aerospace Research Pilot School (ARPS). He recalled that "even Deke Slayton and Warren North seem to have mellowed a bit". Slayton had developed a points system for assessing the candidates. Ten points each were allocated to academics, pilot performance, and character and motivation, for a possible score of thirty points.

Slayton then took thirteen names to a meeting chaired by the MSC director, Robert R. Gilruth. Maxime Faget, his director of engineering and development, had an objection: thirteen was an unlucky number. So Slayton added the next candidate, Walter Cunningham, to the list. The successful candidates received phone calls from Slayton; unsuccessful ones got calls from North or Jack G. Cairl from NASA public relations. Four of the unsuccessful finalists would later become NASA astronauts in the NASA Astronaut Group 5 in 1966: Vance Brand, Ronald Evans, James Irwin and Jack Swigert. Another finalist, Michael J. Adams, would be posthumously awarded his Astronaut Wings for X-15 Flight 3-65-97. Besides Adams, two other finalists later died in aircraft accidents: Alexander Kratz Rupp on June 11, 1965, and Darrell Cornell on October 10, 1984. Finalist John D. Yamnicky was a passenger on American Airlines Flight 77, and was killed when it crashed into the Pentagon during the September 11 attacks. The official announcement of the astronaut selection was made at a press conference at the MSC in Houston on October 18. The new astronauts became known as "The Fourteen".

Demographics 
Seven of the Fourteen were from the USAF: Major Edwin (Buzz) Aldrin and Captains William Anders, Charles Bassett, Michael Collins, Donn Eisele, Theodore Freeman and David Scott. Four were from the United States Navy: Lieutenant Commander Richard Gordon and Lieutenants Alan Bean, Gene Cernan and Roger Chaffee. Captain Clifton (C.C.) Williams was from the United States Marine Corps. There were two civilians: Walter Cunningham, who was a captain in the Marine Corps Reserve; and Russell (Rusty) Schweickart, who was a captain in the Massachusetts Air National Guard. "In retrospect," Collins noted, "we were in the same tradition as the previous two groups, despite the press's natural tendency to highlight differences."

All were married except for Williams, who became the first bachelor astronaut. Their average age at the time of selection was 31, compared with 34.5 for the Mercury Seven and 32.5 for the Next Nine. Flying time was lower; whereas the Seven had averaged 3,500 hours, of which 1,700 was in jets, and the Nine had averaged 2,800 hours with 1,900 in jets, the Fourteen had an average of 2,300 hours, with 1,800 in jets. Educational achievement was a major differentiator. While six of the Nine had bachelor's degrees, and three had master's degrees, only six of the Fourteen had only bachelor's degree, and three of them were working on their master's, seven had master's degrees, and Cunningham was working on his doctorate,  and Buzz Aldrin had a Doctor of Science degree from Massachusetts Institute of Technology.

All were male and white. President John F. Kennedy was disturbed at the lingering discrimination against African Americans in particular in the armed services, and in 1962 he brought pressure to bear on the Chief of Staff of the United States Air Force, General Curtis LeMay to nominate an African-American astronaut candidate. The USAF selected Captain Edward J. Dwight Jr., a B-57 pilot with 2,000 hours in high-performance jets, an aeronautical engineering degree from Arizona State University, and outstanding performance reviews, for training at the USAF Test Pilot School. Dwight graduated with Class 62-C in April 1963. He was the third African American to attend, after John L. Whitehead Jr., who had graduated in 1958, and Joseph C. Watts, a civilian, in 1960. The fourth would be Robert Henry Lawrence Jr. in 1966; by 1984, six had graduated.

Dwight then applied for the ARPS, and Robert F. Kennedy told LeMay to ensure that he was accepted. The commandant, Colonel Chuck Yeager, protested, saying that there were other pilots that had been rated higher than Dwight. All were accepted, so Class IV had fourteen members instead of the usual eight. "Why in hell would a colored guy want to go into space anyway?" Yeager asked, adding: "And if it was left to me, you guys wouldn't even get a chance to wear an Air Force uniform." Dwight was ranked eighth in his class. Along with the seven ahead of him, Dwight was recommended by the USAF for NASA astronaut training in July 1963. Dwight was not one of the final candidates, although classmates Scott and Freeman were.

Group members

Training 
The fourteen were given classroom instruction, which Collins felt was useful "to bridge the gap between aeronautics and astronautics, to minimize the technological shock we might otherwise experience". The 240-hour course covered astronomy (12 hours), aerodynamics (8 hours), rockets (12 hours), communications (8 hours), space medicine (12 hours), meteorology (5 hours), upper atmospheric physics (12 hours), navigation (34 hours), orbital mechanics (40 hours), computers (36 hours) and geology (58 hours).

The geology classes were a special case, as they were for all astronauts, not just the fourteen. The training in geology included field trips to the Grand Canyon and Meteor Crater in Arizona, Philmont Scout Ranch in New Mexico, Horse Lava Tube System in Bend, Oregon, and the ash flow in the Marathon Uplift in Texas. There was also jungle survival training for the Fourteen in Panama, and desert survival training around Reno, Nevada. Water survival training was conducted at Naval Air Station Pensacola using the Dilbert Dunker.

As the Mercury Seven and the Next Nine had done, each of the fourteen was given an individual area in which to develop expertise that could be shared with the others, and to provide astronaut input to designers and engineers: Aldrin was given mission planning; Anders, environment controls; Bassett, training and simulators; Bean, recovery systems; Cernan, spacecraft propulsion and the Agena; Chaffee, communications; Collins, pressure suits and extravehicular activity; Cunningham, non-flight experiments; Eisele, attitude controls; Freeman, boosters; Gordon, cockpit controls; Schweickart, in-flight experiments; Scott, guidance and navigation; and Williams, range operations and crew safety.

The fourteen were divided between two branches. The Apollo branch was headed by Mercury Seven astronaut Gordon Cooper. It included Pete Conrad from the Nine, and Anders, Cernan, Chaffee, Cunningham, Eisele, Freeman, Gordon and Schweickart from the fourteen. The operations branch was headed by Nine astronaut Neil Armstrong. Assigned to it were Elliot See from the Nine, and Aldrin, Bassett, Bean, Collins, Scott and Williams from the Fourteen.

Legacy 
The Fourteen suffered a high death rate. Bassett, Freeman and Williams were killed in T-38 crashes, and Chaffee in the Apollo 1 fire, before they had a chance to fly in space.  All the rest flew at least once; Aldrin, Bean, Collins and Gordon flew twice, and Cernan and Scott flew three times. Aldrin, Anders, Bean, Cernan, Collins, Gordon and Scott flew to the Moon (Cernan twice), and Aldrin, Bean, Cernan and Scott walked on it.

Notes

References

External links

Multimedia
 "NASA Astronaut Group 3 Presentation (1963)" on YouTube

NASA Astronaut Corps
Lists of astronauts
Buzz Aldrin
William Anders
Alan Bean
Gene Cernan
Michael Collins (astronaut)
Richard F. Gordon Jr.
Rusty Schweickart
David Scott